This is a list of notable Seychellois people:

Academics 

Guy Lionnet - Former Director of Agriculture and author of many works on the history and flora and fauna of Seychelles.

Arts 

 Antoine Abel - writer, sometimes referred to as father of Seychelles literature.
Angie Arnephy - singer and ex-beauty pageant contestant.
Sandra Esparon - singer and performer
Sonia Grandcourt - writer
Regina Melanie - writer
Laurence Norah - award-winning travel photographer, writer, and blogger
Jean-Marc Volcy - musician

Business 
 Kantilal Jivan - businessman

Political figures 
 Joseph Belmont - Vice President of Seychelles (2004-2010)
 Collin Dyer - National Assembly member 
 Danny Faure - President of Seychelles (2016-2020)
 Gérard Hoarau - murdered London-based political dissident
 Sir James Mancham - President of Seychelles (1976-1977)
 Vincent Meriton - Vice-President of Seychelles (2016-2020)
 James Michel - President of Seychelles (2004-2016)
 David Pierre - member of the National Assembly
 Patrick Pillay - Foreign Minister of Seychelles (2005-)
 Wavel Ramkalawan - started as leader of the Seychelles National Party and is an Anglican priest as well as the President of Seychelles (2020-present)
 France-Albert René - Prime Minister (1976-1977) and President (1977-2004) of Seychelles
 Satya Naidu- first Hindu member of Seychelles National Assembly.

Legal 
 Justice of Appeal Jacques Hodoul - Justice of the Seychelles Court of Appeal
 Francis Chang-Sam - former Attorney General, now private legal practitioner 
 Dar Lyon - Chief Justice of the Seychelles, and first class cricketer

Other
Eddy Maillet - FIFA international football referee
Claude Morel - Representative to the UN

Notes and references